Vizontele is a 2001 Turkish comedy-drama film, written and directed by Yılmaz Erdoğan and co-directed by Ömer Faruk Sorak, based on the writer-director's childhood memories of the arrival of the first television to his village in the early 1970s. A sequel, entitled Vizontele Tuuba, involving the director and most of the original cast followed in 2004.

Production
The film was shot on location in Gevaş, Van Province, Turkey.

Synopsis
The mayor (Altan Erkekli) of a small village in Southeastern Turkey in 1974 bitterly opposes the activities of sleazy opportunist Latif (Cezmi Baskın) who runs open-air film screenings and seeks to break his monopoly over village entertainment with the introduction of the first television (called Vizontele by the locals). However, the TRT team sent to deliver the television leave in a hurry after the delivery, leaving them clueless as to how to set it up. The mayor recruits an eccentric electrician called Emin (Yılmaz Erdoğan) and some of his office staff to help him to set up a television transmitter. While Latif seeks to undermine his efforts by convincing the local imam to decry television as the work of the Devil and a slap in the face of Islamic tradition, the Mayor and Emin's team are initially subjected to ridicule with their initial failures to get a signal until they get it atop the highest peak in town. However, they are disheartened when the television only receives channels from neighboring Iran. As they return, one of their companions hits the TV set in frustration, inadvertently switching the channels to Turkish and prompting celebrations. However, their joy is short-lived as the first news broadcast they watch is about the death of the mayor's son in the Turkish invasion of Cyprus. The mayor's wife, who has been wary of the television, orders Emin to bury the TV set in place of their son.

The story is based on the childhood memories of the writer-director Yılmaz Erdoğan of the arrival of the first television to Hakkâri in the early 1970s.

Societal conflicts
The movie tries to represent one of the main conflicts in the Turkish society of the late 1970s, continuing well into the 1980s; that of the religious versus secular groups. "[T]here have always been struggles and contests between secular groups and religious groups over the nature of the political system." This is partly shown through the image of the clergyman of the town, who stutters a lot, and apparently feels vitriolic toward the new-coming television, but later on turns out to be a pawn at the hands of Latif. Children escape his Quran reading class in order to go into the wild and frolic. An obvious point the movie makes in favor of secular ideas is the character of [crazy] Emin (played by one of the directors: Yılmaz Erdoğan). He is pictured as someone who is secluded and one whose only interest is modern technology. But the movie makers are clever enough not to take sides with either side of the conflict. As put eloquently by Başkan, "According to secularization theory, modernization leads to a decline in religion's role in the public realm, with it turning into a matter for the private sphere. Instead, however, the contemporary world has witnessed a resurgence of religion with the emergence of religious movements throughout the world." The first piece of news that the inhabitants get to hear on the new television - that the Mayor's son, who was serving in the Army, was killed during the Turkish invasion of Cyprus in 1974 - is so devastating that a burial of the TV set is in order; an iconic replacement of the burial of the beloved son. And the man who has to bury the TV set is no other than the technocrat of the town, on allegations that it has brought evil to the small community of the religious people.

Cast

 Yılmaz Erdoğan as Deli Emin
 Demet Akbağ as Siti Ana
 Altan Erkekli  as Mayor Nazmi
 Cem Yılmaz as Fikri
 Cezmi Baskın as latif
 Bican Günalan  as Sezgin
 Sebnem Sönmez as Gulizar 
 Iclal Aydin as Reyhan
 Mesut Çakarli as Rifat
 Zeynep Tokuş as Asiye
 Tolga Çevik as Nazif
 Tuncer Salman as Ahmet
 Salih Kalyon as 	Casim
 Sener Kökkaya as Basri
 Erdal Tosun as Sehymus
 Şafak Sezer asVeli
 Adem Atbas as Fatih 
 Serhat Özcan  as Engin
 Caner Alkaya as Iso
 Can Kahraman as Ezo

Awards
 Cologne Mediterranean Film Festival (2001)
 Audience Award (won)
 Antalya Golden Orange Film Festival (2001)
 Golden Orange for Best Actor: Altan Erkekli (won)
 Golden Orange for Best Actress: Demet Akbağ (tied with Yesim Salkim for Sarkici)
 Golden Orange for Best Music: Kardeş Türküler (won)

See also
 Television (2012 film)

References

External links
 
 
 

2001 films
2000s Turkish-language films
2001 comedy-drama films
Films set in Turkey
Turkish comedy-drama films
Films set in 1974